The South San Juan Wilderness is a U.S. Wilderness Area located in the San Juan National Forest, east of Pagosa Springs, in southern Colorado . 

The last known grizzly bear in Colorado was killed in the wilderness in 1979. Some believe that it is still home to a few grizzlies, but there is no sufficient evidence yet to prove this.

Recreation

References

Wilderness areas of Colorado
San Juan National Forest
San Juan Mountains (Colorado)
Sangre de Cristo National Heritage Area
Parks in Archuleta County, Colorado
Protected areas established in 1980
Protected areas of Archuleta County, Colorado
Protected areas of Conejos County, Colorado
1980 establishments in Colorado